Mike MacLeod is a Canadian lacrosse player. He played professional lacrosse for the Toronto Rock of the NLL. MacLeod was selected by the Toronto Rock 15th overall in the 2006 National Lacrosse League Entry Draft.

References

Living people
Canadian lacrosse players
Year of birth missing (living people)